Olyokma may refer to:

Olyokma river, a tributary of the Lena, Russia
Olyokma-Stanovik, a system of mountain ranges in Zabaykalsky Krai, Russia
Olyokma-Chara Plateau, a plateau in the Russian Far East
Olyokma, Amur Oblast, a rural locality in Amur Oblast, Russia
Olyokma Nature Reserve, a protected area in the Russian Far East